Misty was Ray Stevens' twelfth studio album as well as being his seventh and final for Barnaby Records. It was released in 1975. This album contains primarily cover versions of various songs that were popular from the 1920s to the 1950s, though there are two original songs for the album as well ("Sunshine" and "Take Care of Business"). Four singles were lifted from the album: the title track, "Indian Love Call," "Young Love," and "Lady of Spain".

On November 15, 2005, Collectables Records re-released this album and his 1972 album Turn Your Radio On together on one CD.

Track listing

Album credits
Musicians
Keyboards: Ray Stevens (piano, organ, clarinet, ARP synthesizer, vibes, bells, etc.)
Bass: Jack Williams (except for "Misty" and "Sunshine" and "Indian Love Call")
Bass for "Misty" and "Sunshine": Stuart Keathley
Bass for "Indian Love Call": Norbert Putnam
Drums: Jerry Carrigan (except for "Misty" and "Sunshine" and "Indian Love Call")
Drums for "Misty and "Sunshine": Jerry Kroon
Drums for "Indian Love Call": Kenneth Buttrey
Rhythm guitar: Johnny Christopher (except for "Misty" and "Sunshine")
Rhythm guitar for "Misty" and "Sunshine": Mark Casstevens
Banjo for "Misty" and "Sunshine": Mark Casstevens
Banjo for "Deep Purple": Bobby Thompson
Fiddle: Lisa Silver
Steel: Hal Rugg (except for "Misty" and "Sunshine")
Steel for "Misty" and "Sunshine": Jay Dee Maness
Saxophone: Norman Ray
Backup voices: Ray Stevens, Toni Wine, Lisa Silver
Engineer: Tom Knox
Arranged and produced by: Ray Stevens for Ahab Productions, Inc.
Art director: Neil Terk
Photography: Keats Tyler
Production supervisor: Bob Scerbo

Charts

Singles - Billboard (North America)

References

1975 albums
Ray Stevens albums
Barnaby Records albums